Susan Halgedahl is a geologist known for her research into the physics that govern magnetic rocks and for her work  on fossils from Utah's Wheeler Formation.

Education and career 
Halgedahl has a B.A.in applied physics from the University of California, San Diego (1975). She earned her Ph.D. in geological sciences from the University of California, Santa Barbara in 1981. She subsequently worked at ARCO Oil and Gas Company and Lamont-Doherty Geological Observatory before moving to the University of Utah in 1993. As of 2021, Halgedahl is an Associate Professor Emerita in the Geology and Geophysics Department at the University of Utah.

Research 

For her Ph.D. research, Halgedahl investigated rocks that retain their magnetic orientation, such titanomagnetite, in samples from the Ocean Drilling Program. Her Ph.D. research investigated how specific rocks retain a magnetic signal which has implications for the ability of these rocks to track changes in Earth's magnetic field over time. Her research also examined the impact of temperature on the ability of rocks to maintain their magnetic signature and how changes in the volume and chemical composition of pyrrhotite do not alter its retention of a magnetic signal. The magnetic signal in rocks can be used to reconstruct the development of the Arctic Basin over geologic time.

Halgedahl's research into fossils in the Wheeler Formation in Utah used geophysical measurements to define changes in sea level that led to the high abundance of fossils found in the region. She subsequently discovered multiple jellyfish fossils in Utah and this research extended the age of jellyfish to 505 million years ago, within the middle Cambrian era.

Selected publications

Awards and honors 

 Fellow, American Geophysical Union (1997)

References

External links 
 

Fellows of the American Geophysical Union
 University of California, Santa Barbara alumni
University of California, San Diego alumni
 University of Utah faculty
21st-century American geologists
Year of birth missing (living people)
Living people